Rushall Junction (or Newton Junction) is the southern limit of the Rushall Canal where it meets the Tame Valley Canal in the West Midlands, England. It opened in 1847, when the Rushall Canal was built to create connections between the Birmingham Canal Navigations system and the Wyrley and Essington Canal, following the amalgamation of the two companies in 1840.

History
The Tame Valley Canal was built as part of a solution to the problem of congestion at Farmers Bridge Locks, where the Birmingham Canal Navigations main line ended and the Birmingham and Fazeley Canal began. The flight of 13 locks at the start of the Birmingham and Fazeley was the main link between the Birmingham system and the route to London via Aston Junction, the Digbeth Branch Canal and the Warwick and Birmingham Canal. The Tame Valley Canal, in conjunction with the Birmingham and Warwick Junction Canal, provided a northern bypass around the congestion. Both were authorised by Acts of Parliament on the same day, and both opened on 14 February 1844. The Tame Valley Canal ran from Tame Valley Junction on the Walsall Canal to Salford Junction on the Birmingham and Fazeley. The Birmingham and Warwick Junction Canal was a short link between Salford Junction and the Warwick and Birmingham Canal at Bordesley Junction. It included the five Garrison Locks, which saved boats from having to ascend the eleven locks of the Aston flight, and descend the six of the Ashted flight on the Digbeth Branch. The route from Salford Junction to Warwick and on to London became part of the Grand Union Canal in 1929.

Following the amalgamation of the Wyrley and Essington Canal and the Birmingham Canal Navigations in 1840, a number of links between the two systems were constructed. A flight of locks at Walsall joined the Walsall Canal to Birchills Junction, and once the Tame Valley Canal was open, work started on the Rushall Canal, to connect it to the southern end of the Daw End Branch of the Wyrley and Essington at Longwood Junction.

Location
In the other direction, the canal heads to the south east, passing under a towpath bridge and the eastern sliproads of the M5 motorway. It reaches the top lock of the 13-lock Perry Barr flight, which drops the level of the canal by  after . The Tame Valley Canal has towpaths on both banks for most of its length.

The Rushall Canal heads northwards, under a towpath bridge, and almost immediately under the M6 motorway. After the motorway, there are three accommodation bridges, the third of which, Hill Farm Bridge, is a grade II listed structure. It is made of cast iron with abutments of brick and sandstone, and the balustrades consist of a latticework of saltire crosses. The footbridge to the east of the junction is of a similar design, and is also listed.

See also

Canals of the United Kingdom
History of the British canal system

Bibliography

References

Canal junctions in England
Canals in the West Midlands (county)
Birmingham Canal Navigations